Héctor Ricardo Lacognata Zaragoza (born 6 September 1962 in Asunción) is a Paraguayan physician, politician, and diplomat.

He was Minister of Foreign Relations in the cabinet of President Fernando Lugo (2009-2011).

References

External links
 Foreign Minister Lacognata 

1962 births
People from Asunción
Paraguayan pediatricians
Foreign Ministers of Paraguay
Living people